Lucanus is a genus of stag beetles (Lucanidae).

List of species

 Lucanus adelmae Zilioli, 2003
 Lucanus angusticornis Didier, 1925
 Lucanus atratus Hope, 1831
 Lucanus aunsani Zilioli, 2000
 Lucanus barbarossa Fabricius, 1801
 Lucanus brivoi Zilioli, 2003
 Lucanus cantori Hope, 1842
 Lucanus capreolus (Linnaeus, 1763) - pinching bug 
 Lucanus cervus (Linnaeus, 1758) - European stag beetle 
 Lucanus confusus (Boucher, 1994)
 Lucanus cyclommatoides Didier, 1928
 Lucanus datunensis Hashimoto, 1984
 Lucanus delavayi Fairmaire, 1887
 Lucanus dohertyi Boileau, 1911
 Lucanus elaphus (Fabricius, 1775) - giant stag beetle 
 Lucanus fairmairei Planet, 1897
 Lucanus ferriei Planet, 1898
 Lucanus formosanus Planet, 1899
 Lucanus fortunei Saunders, 1854
 Lucanus fryi Boileau, 1911
 Lucanus fukinukiae Katsura, 2002
 Lucanus gamunus Sawada & Watanabe, 1960
 Lucanus hayashii Nagai, 2000
 Lucanus hermani DeLisle, 1973
 Lucanus hildegardae Zilioli, 2002
 Lucanus ibericus Motschulsky, 1845
 Lucanus kanoi Y. Kurosawa, 1966
 Lucanus kirchneri Zilioli, 1999
 Lucanus koyamai Akiyama & H. Hirasawa, 1990
 Lucanus kraatzi Nagel, 1926
 Lucanus kurosawai Sakaino, 1995
 Lucanus laetus Arrow, 1943
 Lucanus laminifer Waterhouse, 1890
 Lucanus ludivinae Boucher, 1998
 Lucanus lunifer Hope, 1833
 Lucanus maculifemoratus Motschulsky, 1861
 Lucanus mazama (LeConte, 1861)
 Lucanus maedai
 Lucanus mearesii Hope, 1842
 Lucanus miwai Y. Kurosawa, 1966
 Lucanus nangsarae Nagai, 2000
 Lucanus nobilis Didier, 1925
 Lucanus nosei Nagai, 2000
 Lucanus ogakii Imanishi, 1990
 Lucanus parryi Boileau, 1899
 Lucanus pesarinii Zilioli, 1998
 Lucanus placidus Say, 1825
 Lucanus planeti Planet, 1899
 Lucanus prossi Zilioli, 2000
 Lucanus pulchellus Didier, 1925
 Lucanus sericeus Didier, 1925
 Lucanus smithi Parry, 1862
 Lucanus swinhoei Parry, 1874
 Lucanus szetschuanicus Hanus, 1932
 Lucanus tetraodon Thunberg, 1806
 Lucanus tibetanus Planet, 1898
 Lucanus tsukamotoi Nagai, 2002
 Lucanus villosus Hope, 1831
 Lucanus westermanii Hope & Westwood, 1845
 Lucanus xerxes (Král, 2005)
 Lucanus ziliolii Fukinuki, 2000

Species currently placed in other genera (Huang 2010):

 Noseolucanus denticulus (Boucher, 1995)
 Noseolucanus zhengi Huang, 2006
 Eolucanus davidis (Deyrolle, 1878)
 Eolucanus gracilis Albers, 1889
 Eolucanus lesnei (Planet, 1905)
 Eolucanus mingyiae Huang, 2010
 Eolucanus oberthueri (Planet, 1896)
 Eolucanus pani Huang, 2010
 Eolucanus prometheus (Boucher & Huang, 1991)

Gallery

References
 Biolib

 
Lucanidae genera